Lesotho is a source and transit country for women and children subjected to trafficking in persons, specifically conditions of forced labor and forced prostitution, and for men in forced labor. Women and children are subjected within Lesotho to involuntary domestic servitude and children, to a lesser extent, to commercial sexual exploitation. Basotho victims of transnational trafficking are most often taken to South Africa. Long-distance truck drivers offer to transport women and girls looking for legitimate employment in South Africa. En route, some of these women and girls are raped by the truck drivers, then later prostituted by the driver or an associate. Many men who migrate voluntarily to South Africa to work illegally in agriculture and mining become victims of labor trafficking. Victims work for weeks or months for no pay; just before their promised "pay day" the employers turn them over to authorities to be deported for immigration violations. Women and children are exploited in South Africa in involuntary domestic servitude and commercial sex, and some girls may still be brought to South Africa for forced marriages in remote villages. Some Basotho women who voluntarily migrate to South Africa seeking work in domestic service become victims of traffickers, who detain them in prison-like conditions and force them to engage in prostitution. Most internal and transnational traffickers operate through informal, loose associations and acquire victims from their families and neighbors. Chinese and reportedly Nigerian organized crime units, however, acquire some Basotho victims while transporting foreign victims through Lesotho to Johannesburg, where they "distribute" victims locally or move them overseas. Bathoso children who have lost at least one parent to HIV/AIDS are more vulnerable to traffickers' manipulations; older children trying to feed their siblings are most likely to be lured by a trafficker's fraudulent job offer.

The Government of Lesotho does not fully comply with the minimum standards for the elimination of trafficking; however, it is making significant efforts to do so. While operating under severe resource constraints, the government formed an active multi-sectoral task force, created a national plan of action, trained more officials to identify trafficking situations and victims, and raised public awareness. Despite these efforts, however, the government has shown no evidence of efforts to combat human trafficking through law enforcement activities, and protections for victims are still minimal. U.S. State Department's Office to Monitor and Combat Trafficking in Persons placed the country in "Tier 2"  in 2017.

Prosecution
The government did not increase its law enforcement efforts during the past year, and no suspected trafficking offenders were identified during the reporting period. Lesotho has no comprehensive anti-trafficking law, which hinders the government's ability to address human trafficking. Lesotho does not prohibit all forms of trafficking in persons, though its Constitution prohibits slavery, servitude, and forced labor. The Child Protection Act of 1980, the Sexual Offenses Act of 2003, the Common Law, and the Labor Code Order of 1981, as amended, prescribe sufficiently stringent penalties of at least five years' imprisonment for crimes that could be used to prosecute trafficking offenses. The Child Protection and Welfare Bill, drafted in 2005, was approved by the Cabinet in 2009 and is currently awaiting debate in Parliament. It prohibits child trafficking and prescribes sufficiently stringent penalties of 20 years' imprisonment for trafficking offenders. No current or draft laws specifically prohibit the trafficking of adults. The government did not provide official data on trafficking or trafficking-related prosecutions or convictions during the reporting period. The Multi-Sectoral Committee, an anti-trafficking task force, in partnership with a local NGO, arranged for and participated in three trafficking workshops. The session in October 2009 particularly targeted police and immigration officials, and focused on identifying trafficking offenders and their victims, as well as identifying laws that could be used to prosecute traffickers under Lesotho's existing legal system. While officials opened no official investigations into trafficking activity in Lesotho, the Lesotho Mounted Police Service worked with South African police to investigate suspected trafficking cases in border areas. Each month, immigration officers at the Maseru border post assisted approximately 20–30 victims of labor trafficking, usually men exploited in forced labor before being deported from South Africa. Law enforcement officers did not proactively identify victims among other vulnerable populations, such as women and children in prostitution, and most were not trained to identify victims they may encounter as part of their normal duties. There was no evidence of government involvement in or tolerance of trafficking on a local or institutional level.

Protection
The Lesotho government took minimal steps to protect victims of trafficking over the last year. Most officials did not proactively identify victims, and agencies have no formal mechanism for referring victims to service providers. Lesotho has no care facilities specifically for trafficking victims. Orphanages supported by the Government of Lesotho and NGOs are available to provide some services to children presumed to be victims of trafficking. Staff from the Child and Gender Protection Unit (CGPU) of the Lesotho Mounted Police Service provided counseling to women and children who were victims of abuse, including some they believe were trafficking victims. The government acknowledged the need for safe shelter for victims and included the need in its draft anti-trafficking national plan of action. Basotho law does not protect victims from prosecution or otherwise being penalized for unlawful acts committed as a direct result of being trafficked, nor does it provide foreign victims with legal alternatives to their removal to countries where they may face hardship or retribution.

Prevention
The Government of Lesotho clearly increased its efforts to prevent trafficking. The Multi-Sectoral Committee on Trafficking, which was formed in July 2009 and is composed of representatives of government ministries, NGOs, police, border security, the judicial system, UNDP, UNICEF, academia, and religious institutes met regularly and began working on a national plan of action. The action plan was nearly complete in early 2010. The government requested and received funding from UNDP to research trafficking in Lesotho; the Ministry of Home Affairs is expected to make the final report available in mid-2010. Authorities conducted several high-visibility information campaigns during the past year, spurring a sharp rise in the number of news reports about human trafficking. Campaigns run in partnership with the Government of South Africa targeted large border towns where trafficking is likely more prevalent. The CGPU and partners in local communities conducted awareness workshops, and trained other officers in the Lesotho Mounted Police on victim awareness and identification. UNICEF helped the CGPU to distribute educational materials on human trafficking. The Minister of Home Affairs presided over the launch of an NGO's Red Light 2010 Campaign, which addressed sex trafficking in the context of the World Cup in South Africa in June 2010."The Red Light 2010 Campaign." As part of national campaigns against gender-based violence, child sexual abuse, and human trafficking, the government made efforts to reduce the demand for commercial sex acts.

References

Lesotho
Lesotho
Human rights abuses in Lesotho
Crime in Lesotho by type